The District of Kavajë was one of the 36 districts of Albania, which were dissolved in July 2000 and replaced by 12 counties. In consisted of 2 municipalities and 8 communes, with the communes containing a total of 64 villages. Its population at the 2001 census was 78,179 inhabitants.

Administrative divisions
The district consisted of the following municipalities:

Kavajë
Golem
Helmas
Kavajë
Luz i Vogël
Synej

Rrogozhinë
Gosë
Kryevidh
Lekaj
Rrogozhinë
Sinaballaj

References

Districts of Albania
Geography of Tirana County